Chavanga is a rural locality (a Selo) in Tersky District of Murmansk Oblast, Russia. The village is located on the Kola Peninsula, at the mouth of the river Chavanga. It is 13 m above sea level.

References

Rural localities in Murmansk Oblast